The Freeman River is a short river in west-central Alberta, Canada. The Freeman takes its name from the fur traders, who, after leaving the employ of the Hudson's Bay Company or the North West Company, decided to remain in the interior and work as free trappers or free hunters.

Course
The river flows in a southeastern direction for much of its course. It flows through a significant petroleum and natural gas field near the town of Swan Hills, before being bridged by Alberta Highway 32. The river then runs parallel to Alberta Highway 33, takes on the Morse River, and joins the Athabasca River near Fort Assiniboine.

Flooding
The Freeman River has experienced significant flooding in the past. Particularly notable is the flood of July 1971, which swept away a bridge crossing the river near Fort Assiniboine, Alberta. One first-year science student from the University of Alberta, who was working with the Provincial Ecology Corps over the summer, was killed when the bridge collapsed and fell into the river.

Tributaries
Mons Lake
Louis Creek
Judy Creek
Freeman Creek
Sarah Creek
Morse River

See also
List of Alberta rivers

References

External links

Rivers of Alberta